Lindenlaub is a surname. Notable people with the surname include:

 Andreas Lindenlaub (born 1949), German politician (DSU) and former representative of the People's Chamber of East Germany
 Dieter Lindenlaub (Professor Dr. Dieter Lindenlaub), professor of economics
 Karl Walter Lindenlaub (born 1957), German cinematographer
 Uwe Lindenlaub (born 1966), German table tennis-player

German-language surnames